Boronia crassipes is a plant in the citrus family, Rutaceae and is endemic to the south-west of Western Australia. It is an erect, spindly, glabrous shrub with simple leaves, and pale red or pale mauve, four petalled flowers.

Description

Taxonomy and naming
Boronia crassipes was first formally described in 1845 by Friedrich Gottlieb Bartling and the description was published in Plantae Preissianae. The specific epithet (crassipes) is derived from the Latin words  crassus meaning "thick", "fat" or "stout" and pes meaning "a foot".

Distribution and habitat
This boronia grows peaty heath, in winter-wet sawamps and along creeklines near Albany in the  Jarrah Forest and Warren biogeographic regions.

Conservation
Boronia crasspies is classified as "Priority Three" by the Government of Western Australia Department of Parks and Wildlife meaning that it is poorly known and known from only a few locations but is not under imminent threat.

References

crassipes
Flora of Western Australia
Plants described in 1845
Taxa named by Friedrich Gottlieb Bartling